Albert Day & Sons were iron and brass founders in Mark, Somerset, in the early twentieth century.

Records are held at the Somerset Heritage Centre (now managed by the South West Heritage Trust).

References 

Foundries in the United Kingdom
Companies based in Somerset
History of Somerset